The Chattanooga, Rome and Columbus Railroad (CR&C) was a railroad in Georgia.

Originally chartered in 1881 as the Rome and Carrollton Railroad, the railroad's name became the Chattanooga, Rome and Columbus Railroad in 1887, before any tracks were constructed.

In 1891, the Savannah and Western Railroad purchased the CR&C, but when the S&W went bankrupt, Federal Courts returned the CR&C to its original owners. In 1897, the railroad was sold to Simon Borg and Company and renamed the Chattanooga, Rome and Southern Railroad.

See also

Chattanooga Choo Choo

References

External links
Details of the song 'Chattanooga Choo Choo', written in 1941, sung by Glen Miller
Georgia's Railroad History & Heritage - Rome & Carrollton Railroad
Georgia's Railroad History & Heritage - Chattanooga, Rome & Columbus Railroad

3 ft gauge railways in the United States
Defunct Georgia (U.S. state) railroads
Defunct Tennessee railroads
Railway companies established in 1887
Railway companies disestablished in 1897
Predecessors of the Central of Georgia Railway
Narrow gauge railroads in Georgia (U.S. state)
Narrow gauge railroads in Tennessee
1897 mergers and acquisitions